is a prefectural museum in Fukuyama, Japan, dedicated to the history and culture of the Setouchi region. It has a particular focus upon the medieval settlement of Kusado Sengen. The museum opened in the grounds of Fukuyama Castle in 1989.

See also

 List of Historic Sites of Japan (Hiroshima)
 Aki Province
 Bingo Province

References

External links
 Hiroshima Prefectural Museum of History
  Hiroshima Prefectural Museum of History

Museums in Hiroshima Prefecture
Fukuyama, Hiroshima
History museums in Japan
Prefectural museums
Museums established in 1989
1989 establishments in Japan